Route 81 is a state highway in Connecticut from Clinton center through Killingworth center to the village of Higganum in the town of Haddam.

Route description

Route 81 begins at an intersection with US 1 in the town center of Clinton and heads north as Hull Street then quickly shifts to High Street. North of I-95 in Clinton, the road is known as Killingworth Turnpike. In Killingworth, Route 81 becomes Clinton Road and has a junction with Route 80 south of the town center at a rotary. North of Route 80, the road becomes known as Higganum Road, intersecting with Route 148 north of the town center before crossing into the town of Haddam. In Haddam, Route 81 is known as Killingworth Road and has an interchange with Route 9 at exit 9 before ending at an intersection with Route 154 in the village of Higganum.

History
In the 19th century, the road connecting the villages of Clinton, Killingworth, and Higganum was a private turnpike known as the Killingworth and Haddam Turnpike. The turnpike was chartered in 1813 and collected tolls until 1850. In 1922, the length of the old turnpike was designated as a state road with designation State Highway 106. As part of the 1932 state highway renumbering, modern Route 81 was created from old Highway 106.

Junction list

References

External links

081
Transportation in Middlesex County, Connecticut